Francis IV may refer to:

 Francis IV of Beauharnais (1600–1681)
 Francis IV, Duke of Modena (1779–1846)